, also Iozen, is a  tall mountain in Japan, on the border of Kanazawa City, Ishikawa and Nanto City, Toyama.

Notes

Mountains of Toyama Prefecture